All of Me is a studio album by American jazz singer and guitarist John Pizzarelli, backed by a string orchestra that includes  his brother, Martin Pizzarelli. Also on the album is his father, guitarist Bucky Pizzarelli.

Track listing 
"Three Little Words" (Bert Kalmar, Harry Ruby) - (2:54)     
"If I Had You" (James Campbell, Reginald Connelly, Ted Shapiro) - (4:20)     
"The More I See You" (Harry Warren, Mack Gordon) - (4:42)     
"'S Wonderful" (George Gershwin, Ira Gershwin) - (5:10)     
"This Will Make You Laugh" (Irene Higginbotham) - (3:59)     
"All of Me" (Gerald Marks, Seymour Simons) - (4:28)     
"The River is Blue" (John Pizzarelli) - (4:05)     
"I Know That You Know" (Anne Caldwell, Vincent Youmans) - (2:33)     
"For All We Know" (J. Fred Coots, Sam M. Lewis) - (4:23)     
"Love Falls into Place" (John Pizzarelli) - (4:20)     
"My Baby Just Cares for Me" (Gus Kahn, Walter Donaldson) - (3:36)     
"Roslyn" (John Pizzarelli) - (2:57)

Personnel
 John Pizzarelli – guitar, vocals
 Anthony Kadleck – trumpet
 Anthony Ponella – trumpet
 Randy Sandke – trumpet
 Rocky Ciccarone – trombone
 Michael Davis – trombone
 Paul Faulise – trombone
 Jim Pugh – trombone
 Scott Robinson – flute, soprano and tenor saxophones
 Phil Bodner – flute, alto saxophone
 Sol Schlinger – flute, baritone saxophone
 Lawrence Feldman – flute
 John Frosk – flute
 William Kerr – flute
 Walt Levinsky – alto saxophone
 Frank Griffith – tenor saxophone
 Ken Levinsky – piano
 Bucky Pizzarelli – guitar, vocals, liner notes
 Martin Pizzarelli – double bass
 Joe Cocuzzo – drums
 Tony Corbiscello – drums
 Gordon Gottlieb – percussion, vibraphone

Strings
 Alan Martin, Louann Montesi, John Pintavalle, Alvin Rogers, Marilyn Wright, Anthony Posk, Ariana Bronne, Ruth Buffington, Peter Dimitriades, Max Ellen, Gerald Tarack, Charles Libove – violin
 Anne Callahan, Avron Coleman, Janet Nepkie, Seymour Barab – cello

References

1992 albums
John Pizzarelli albums
Novus Records albums